James Hawker (baptised 29 August 1836 – 7 August 1921) was an English poacher.

He was born in Daventry, Northamptonshire and began poaching as a teenager to gain extra income whilst working as an apprentice bootmaker. He joined the militia to acquire a gun and reached the rank of corporal, although he left Daventry after falling out with the head gamekeeper at Badby. 

In 1893 he was elected to the Oadby school-board (sitting next to the "Leading Gentlemen" on whose lands he poached) and in 1894 was a member of the Oadby parish council. Hawker kept photographs of William Ewart Gladstone, Charles Bradlaugh, Augustine Birrell, Thomas Sayers, and Gladys Cooper in his diary. In 1921 he died of a heart attack at Stoughton Road, Oadby and was buried in Oadby cemetery.

In 1961 the Oxford University Press published his journal, written in 1904–1905, a "mixture of autobiography, poacher's handbook, and radical philosophy". A play of Hawker's life, The Poacher, was produced by the Emma Theatre Company in 1980 and written by Andrew Marley and Lloyd Johnston. After the first performance of the play, a collection was raised which paid for a headstone at Hawker's grave, bearing the motto: "I will Poach till I die".

Notes

Further reading
Garth Christian (ed.), James Hawker's Journal: A Victorian Poacher (Oxford University Press, 1961, 1979).
David Sneath and Barry Lount, The Life of a Victorian Poacher: James Hawker (1982).

1836 births
1921 deaths
Poachers
People from Daventry
People from Oadby
Burials in Leicestershire